Ponticaulis is a genus of bacteria from the family of Hyphomonadaceae.

References

Bacteria genera